In mathematics and statistics, a quantitative variable may be continuous or discrete if they are typically obtained by measuring or counting, respectively. If it can take on two particular real values such that it can also take on all real values between them (even values that are arbitrarily close together), the variable is continuous in that interval. If it can take on a value such that there is a non-infinitesimal gap on each side of it containing no values that the variable can take on, then it is discrete around that value.   In some contexts a variable can be discrete in some ranges of the number line and continuous in others.

Continuous variable

A continuous variable is a variable whose value is obtained by measuring, i.e.,  one which can take on an uncountable set of values.

For example, a variable over a non-empty range of the real numbers is continuous, if it can take on any value in that range.

Methods of calculus are often used in problems in which the variables are continuous, for example in continuous optimization problems.

In statistical theory, the probability distributions of continuous variables can be expressed in terms of probability density functions.

In continuous-time dynamics, the variable time is treated as continuous, and the equation describing the evolution of some variable over time is a differential equation. The instantaneous rate of change is a well-defined concept.

Discrete variable
In other words; a discrete variable over a particular interval of real values is one for which, for any value in the range that the variable is permitted to take on, there is a positive minimum distance to the nearest other permissible value. The number of permitted values is either finite or countably infinite. Common examples are variables that must be integers, non-negative integers, positive integers, or only the integers 0 and 1.

Methods of calculus do not readily lend themselves to problems involving discrete variables. Examples of problems involving discrete variables include integer programming.

In statistics, the probability distributions of discrete variables can be expressed in terms of probability mass functions.

In discrete time dynamics, the variable time is treated as discrete, and the equation of evolution of some variable over time is called a difference equation.

In econometrics and more generally in regression analysis, sometimes some of the variables being empirically related to each other are 0-1 variables, being permitted to take on only those two values. A variable of this type is called a dummy variable. If the dependent variable is a dummy variable, then logistic regression or probit regression is commonly employed.

See also

 Continuous function
 Count data
 Discrete mathematics
 Continuous spectrum
 Discrete spectrum
 Discrete time and continuous time
 Continuous-time stochastic process
 Discrete-time stochastic process
 Continuous modelling
 Discrete modelling
 Continuous geometry
 Discrete geometry
 Continuous series representation
 Discrete series representation
 Discretization
 Interpolation
 Discrete measure

References

Mathematical terminology